Antje Angela Malestein (born 31 January 1993) is a Dutch handball player for Ferencvárosi TC and the Dutch national team.

She participated at the 2011 World Women's Handball Championship in Brazil.

She also competed at the 2012 Women's Junior World Handball Championship in the Czech Republic.

Achievements
 Bundesliga
  : 2017, 2019
 Eredivisie
  : 2012
Nemzeti Bajnokság:
: 2021

Individual awards
 All-Star Right Wing of the EHF Champions League: 2022

References

External links

1993 births
Living people
Dutch female handball players
People from Spakenburg
Expatriate handball players
Dutch expatriate sportspeople in Germany
Dutch expatriate sportspeople in Hungary
Ferencvárosi TC players (women's handball)
Handball players at the 2016 Summer Olympics
Olympic handball players of the Netherlands
Handball players at the 2020 Summer Olympics
Sportspeople from Utrecht (province)
21st-century Dutch women